Vaneyevo is a rural locality (a village) in Irdomatskoye Rural Settlement, Cherepovetsky District, Vologda Oblast, Russia. The population was 65 as of 2002. There are 15 streets.

Geography 
Vaneyevo is located 12 km southeast of Cherepovets (the district's administrative centre) by road. Irdomatka is the nearest rural locality.

References 

Rural localities in Cherepovetsky District